A muscarinic agonist is an agent that activates the activity of the muscarinic acetylcholine receptor. The muscarinic receptor has different subtypes, labelled M1-M5, allowing for further differentiation.

Clinical significance

M1 

M1-type muscarinic acetylcholine receptors  play a role in cognitive processing.  In Alzheimer disease (AD), amyloid formation may decrease the ability of these receptors to transmit signals, leading to decreased cholinergic activity. As these receptors themselves appear relatively unchanged in the disease process, they have become a potential therapeutic target  when trying to improve cognitive function in patients with AD.

A number of muscarinic agonists have been developed and are under investigation to treat AD. These agents show promise as they are neurotrophic, decrease amyloid depositions, and improve damage due to oxidative stress. Tau-phosphorylation is decreased and   cholinergic function enhanced.  Notably several agents of the AF series of muscarinic agonists have become the focus of such research:. AF102B, AF150(S), AF267B. In animal models that are mimicking the damage of AD, these agents appear promising.

The agent xanomeline has been proposed as a potential treatment for schizophrenia.

M3 

In the form of pilocarpine, muscarinic receptor agonists have been used medically for a short time.
 M3 agonists
 Aceclidine, for glaucoma
 Arecoline, an alkaloid present in the Betel nut
 Pilocarpine is a drug that acts as a muscarinic receptor agonist that is used to treat glaucoma
 Cevimeline (AF102B) (Evoxac®) is a muscarinic agonist that is  a Food and Drug Administration (FDA)-approved drug and used for the management of dry mouth in Sjögren's syndrome

Muscarinic versus nicotinic activity

Muscarinic acetylcholine receptor subtypes 

The targets for muscarinic agonists are the muscarinic receptors: M1, M2, M3, M4 and M5. These receptors are GPCRs coupled to either Gi or Gq subunits.

See also 
 Muscarine
 Muscarinic acetylcholine receptor
 Muscarinic antagonist
 Nicotinic acetylcholine receptor
 Nicotinic agonist
 Nicotinic antagonist

References

External links